The following is a list of Tai ethnic groups in India.

Ahom
Phake
Khamti
Aiton
Khamyang
Turung
Lai

Ethnic groups in India